Urheilupuisto is a multi-use stadium in Mikkeli, Finland.  It is currently used mostly for football matches.  The stadium holds 4,000 people.

Football venues in Finland
Mikkeli
Buildings and structures in South Savo